Norwich Arts Centre is a live music venue, theatre and art gallery located in St Benedict's Street in Norwich, Norfolk, England. It has a capacity of 300 for standing music concerts and 120 for seated events. In November 2014, it was named "Britain's Best Small Venue" by the NME.

History
In 1976, a group formed for the purpose of starting an alternative venue for the visual and performing arts in Norwich. With the help of Norwich City Council the venue was opened in 1977 in a former carpet factory on St Benedicts Street and named "Premises". It moved to its current site, St Swithin's Church, in 1980 and has remained there since. The centre currently operates as a registered charity.

Although a small venue, Norwich Arts Centre has hosted many well known bands and comedians, including Nirvana, Oasis, Muse, The Stone Roses, Manic Street Preachers, The Libertines, Coldplay, Enter Shikari, Biffy Clyro, Foals Kasabian, Mumford & Sons, Bombay Bicycle Club, Jack Dee, Mark Lamarr, Sue Perkins, Steve Harley (as a 3-man electro-acoustic set), Mark Thomas, Noel Fielding, David Baddiel, Ross Noble, Frank Skinner and Josie Long.

Following a gig on 15 May 1991, Richey Edwards of the Manic Street Preachers carved the words "4 Real" into his forearm with a razor blade following an interview with journalist Steve Lamacq.

St Swithin's Church

The redundant church which houses the Norwich Arts Centre is dedicated to Saint Swithun and dates from 1349, although an earlier, Anglo-Saxon church may have existed on the site.

The area was originally a wealthy one, with four medieval churches close to each other. However it had become a slum by the nineteenth century. St Swithin's became redundant and was closed in 1881. In 1882, the church's tower was demolished as it had become unsafe, this was later replaced by a bell-cot. The building was back in use as a church between 1883 and 1891, after which time it fell into disrepair.

In 1905, a clergyman, John Sawbridge, raised funds for it to be reopened as an Evangelical church, to cater for the poor and deprived surrounding area. There was sufficient money for a large, adjoining parish mission and school room to be constructed in 1908. During the following decades, this building served the local community in a number of ways. During the Second World War, it was the headquarters of the local Home Guard.

By 1951 the church was again redundant due to falling numbers of local residents. In 1954, the church was designated a Grade I Listed building. It was used as a furniture warehouse until it was taken over by the Arts Centre in 1980. The church itself became an auditorium, and the schoolroom became an exhibition space and cafe.

Little of the interior of the church remains in place. During the conversion to an auditorium in the early 1980s it was stripped of its church features. Medieval features in the interior, including two choir-stalls that were recorded by Nikolaus Pevsner, no longer exist. An exception are ten monuments, the oldest being to Sibilla Skottowe (died 1657) and Anne Skottowe (died 1662). Another monument is to William Abbott (1754-1818), a veteran of the American War of Independence, who served at the Battle of Bunker Hill.

See also
 The Waterfront, Norwich
 Norwich Cinema City
 Norwich Playhouse

References

External links
Norwich Arts Centre
Film about the history of the centre, BBC Introducing In Norfolk.

Culture in Norwich
Music venues in Norfolk
Arts centres in England
Tourist attractions in Norwich
Churches in Norwich
Theatres in Norwich